Highway 945 is a highway in the Canadian province of Saskatchewan. It runs from Highway 24 near Chitek Lake to Highway 943 near Island Lake.

The highway provides access to two provincial recreational sites, Shell Lake Recreation Site and Chitek Lake Recreation Site.

See also 
Roads in Saskatchewan
Transportation in Saskatchewan

References 

945